A larch is a tree.

Larch, or Larches may also refer to:
 Larch family of computer specification languages
 Larch, Michigan, a community in the United States
 Larch Hill, headquarters of Scouting Ireland

 Larches, Preston, a district of Preston, in Lancashire, England
 The Larches (Cambridge, Massachusetts), a building in Cambridge, Massachusetts
 Larch Mountain (Multnomah County, Oregon), an extinct volcano between Portland and Mount Hood
 Larch Mountain (Washington County, Oregon), in the northern Oregon Coast Range near Timber, Oregon
 Larch Mountain (Clark County, Washington), between Vancouver and Silver Star Mountain
 Larch Mountain (Clark County, Washington), in the Black Hills WSW of Olympia and south of Shelton

People
 John Larch (1914–2005), American radio, film, and television actor.

Technology
 Larch a British rocket engine.
 USS Larch (AN-21), an Aloe-class net laying ship which was assigned to serve the U.S. Navy during World War II

See also
 Larch Mountain (disambiguation)
 Larch bolete, a number of fungi in the order Boletales which occur in association with species of larch